"Beautiful Night" is a song by Paul McCartney and is the 13th track on his 1997 album Flaming Pie. In December 1997, it was released as the third and final single from that album, peaking at number 25 in the UK Singles Chart (see 1997 in British music). The single featured "Love Come Tumbling Down" and "Same Love" as b-sides both of which were previously unreleased tracks and were recorded in 1987 and 1988 respectively.

The song was originally recorded in August 1986 in New York City. That version can be heard on the CD single as part of the "Oobu Joobu" section. The 1986 version was officially released as a stand-alone track in 2020 as a free download on McCartney's website.

The song is the first of three collaborations McCartney recorded with Ringo Starr during Flaming Pie sessions and features an orchestration by George Martin, recorded at Abbey Road Studios.

Critical reception
A reviewer from Music Week gave "Beautiful Night" four out of five, stating that "this epic single stands as McCartney's best ballad since Only Love Remains and is a testament to his recaptured form on Flaming Pie." The magazine's Alan Jones wrote, "Thus far, much of the attention surrounding the new Paul McCartney single Beautiful Night has centred on how lavish and controversial the video is. But it's a vintage piece of McCartney, quite literally since it's an old song dusted down and renovated with an impeccable George Martin score and one of Macca's best vocals in a good while, with extra Beatley support coming from Ringo Starr and surrogate Beatle Jeff Lynne." Claudia Connell from News of the World said that "Macca serves up his best work for years. With Ringo Starr on drums and George Martin producing, it is little wonder that it sounds so much like the Fab Four."

Music video
The video accompanying the single was directed by Julien Temple and had to be re-edited as a brief glimpse of a woman skinnydipping caused a minor controversy. Also appearing in the video were Ringo Starr, Linda McCartney (her final appearance in a music video) and the band Spud (although they are shown performing with McCartney, they did not contribute to the recording of the track). The video debuted during an appearance on The Oprah Winfrey Show.

Track listings
7" , CD1 
"Beautiful Night" – 5:03
"Love Come Tumbling Down" – 4:21
"Oobu Joobu" (Part 5) – 10:15 (CD only)
CD2 
"Beautiful Night" – 5:08
"Same Love" – 3:53
"Oobu Joobu" (Part 6) – 8:33

Oobu Joobu information
The "Oobu Joobu" songs are a series of demos, interviews, and unreleased songs jumbled together into one track.  The name is taken from McCartney's radio program, Oobu Joobu.
"Oobu Joobu" (Part 5) contains:
"And Now" – 0:10
"Oobu Joobu Main Theme" – 1:14
Beautiful Night Chat – 0:09
Paul and Ringo talk about "Beautiful Night" – 2:06
Ringo Chat – 0:09
"Beautiful Night (Flaming Pie Mix)" – 1:31
"Beautiful Night (Original Version)" – 4:02
Goodbyes – 0:17
"Oobu Joobu Main Theme" – 0:37

"Oobu Joobu" (Part 6) contains:
"This One" (jingle) – 0:08
"Oobu Joobu Main Theme" – 0:32
"Oobu Joobu We Love You" – 0:15
Paul talks about Abbey Road – 0:43
"Strawberry Fields Forever" (Paul solo) – 0:14
Paul talks about Abbey Road – 1:31
"Come on Baby" – 0:54
Paul talks about Abbey Road – 0:18
"Come on Baby (contd.)" – 0:33
Paul ends chat about Abbey Road – 0:22
"Okay are You Ready" (jingle) – 0:10
"Love Mix" – 3:02
"Widescreen Radio" (jingle) – 0:05
Goodbye – 0:18
"Oobu Joobu Main Theme" – 0:48

Personnel
Paul McCartney – Lead vocals and backing vocals, acoustic guitar, electric guitar, bass guitar, piano, Wurlitzer electric piano, hammond organ, additional percussion
Linda McCartney – backing vocals
Jeff Lynne – backing vocals, acoustic guitar, electric guitar
Ringo Starr – backing and lead vocals, drums, percussion
George Martin – orchestral arrangement
David Snell – conductor
Geoff Emerick – orchestral sessions audio engineer
Jon Jacobs – orchestral sessions engineer
Peter Cabbin – orchestral sessions engineer
Paul Hicks – orchestral sessions engineer
Susan Milan – flute

Charts

References

External links
Paul McCartney – Beautiful Night at Graham Calkin's Beatles Pages.

1996 songs
1997 singles
Paul McCartney songs
Song recordings produced by Jeff Lynne
Parlophone singles
Songs written by Paul McCartney
Song recordings produced by Paul McCartney
Music published by MPL Music Publishing
Music videos directed by Julien Temple
Music video controversies